Charley Stone is an English multi-instrumentalist musician based in London, UK. She has been a notable part of the London indie music scene since the early 1990s.

History
Charley Stone first came to notice in short-lived riot grrrl band Frantic Spiders, from Exeter, who released EP You're Dead in 1993; she also played in Toxic Shock Syndrome. Stone then joined Britpop band Salad in 1996. In 1997 she replaced Charlotte Hatherley on guitar in the band Nightnurse after Hatherley left to join Ash.

In 1998 Stone joined Gay Dad as guitarist and also first played live with Fosca, as she would continue to do over the next decade. Stone also joined Linus as bass player. By 2003 Stone was playing in Spy '51, who although active since the 1990s released their debut album in 2006.

From 2007 to the present Stone has both performed solo and played with a number of artists including the Priscillas, the New Royal Family/the Famous Cocks, Deptford Beach Babes, Charlotte Hatherley, W*llstonekraft, MX Tyrants, Misters of Circe, and Salad. She has also worked as a producer for new bands, such as the Wimmins' Institute.

In addition, Stone currently plays in the Fallen Women, Desperate Journalist, Sleeper, Keith Top of the Pops and His Minor UK Indie Celebrity All-Star Backing Band, Ye Nuns, Joanne Joanne, the Abba Stripes, and Charley Stone & the Actual Band.

References

External links
 Charley Stone's BBC blog
 Bandcamp

English women guitarists
English guitarists
British indie rock musicians
Britpop musicians
Riot grrrl musicians
Musicians from London
Living people
Year of birth missing (living people)
Underground punk scene in the United Kingdom